360th may refer to:

360th Bombardment Squadron, an inactive United States Air Force unit
360th Civil Affairs Brigade (United States)
360th Fighter Group or 127th Wing, composite unit of the Michigan Air National Guard
360th Fighter Squadron, a unit of the North Carolina Air National Guard
360th Reconnaissance Squadron, later 360th Tactical Electronic Warfare Squadron
360th Rifle Division, a unit of the Soviet Ground Forces

See also
360 (number)
360 (disambiguation)
AD 360, the year 360 (CCCLX) of the Julian calendar
360 BC